Thomas Nyarko Ampem is a Ghanaian politician and member of the Seventh Parliament of the Fourth Republic of Ghana representing the Asuogyaman Constituency in the Eastern Region on the ticket of the National Democratic Congress.

Early life and education 
Ampem hails from Anum. He attended the Kwame Nkrumah University of Science and Technology and holds MSC in Finance from Virginia Commonwealth University, U.S.A.

References

Ghanaian MPs 2017–2021
1978 births
Living people
National Democratic Congress (Ghana) politicians
Ghanaian MPs 2021–2025